UConn Huskies baseball represents the University of Connecticut in college baseball at the NCAA Division I level.

2010

Personnel

Roster

Coaches

Schedule

2012

Roster

Coaches

Schedule

2013

Roster

Coaches

Schedule
A three-game series with Georgetown was moved from Storrs to Hoyas home field Shirley Povich Field in Bethesda, Maryland due to weather conditions.  The Huskies remained the designated home team for the series.

Awards and honors
Pitcher of the Week
Carson Cross (March 18–24)

2014

Roster

Coaches

Schedule

2015

Personnel

Roster

Coaches

Schedule

2016

Personnel

Roster

Coaches

Schedule

2017

Personnel

Roster

Coaches

Schedule

2018

Personnel

Roster

Coaches

Schedule

2019

Personnel

Roster

Coaches

Schedule

Rankings

References

UConn Huskies baseball seasons